I Corps was a corps of the Army of the Republic of Vietnam (ARVN), the army of the nation state of South Vietnam that existed from 1955 to 1975. It was one of four corps of the ARVN. This was the northernmost region of South Vietnam, bordering North Vietnam at the Vietnamese Demilitarized Zone (DMZ). These five provinces are Quảng Trị Province, (Khe Sanh, Đông Hà, Quảng Trị City), Thừa Thiên-Huế Province, (Phu Bai, Huế City), Quảng Nam Province, (Đà Nẵng, Hội An), Quảng Tín Province, (Tam Kỳ, Chu Lai) and Quảng Ngãi Province, (Quảng Ngãi).

I Corps became operational in November 1957.

Among its formations and units were the ARVN 1st Division. The I CTZ, later Military Region 1, was partnered with the U.S. III Marine Expeditionary Force and the XXIV Corps.

Lam Son 719
General Hoàng Xuân Lãm was given responsibility for the I Corps Tactical Zone in 1967. He coordinated the South Vietnamese Operation Lam Sơn 719 offensive which aimed at striking the North Vietnamese logistical corridor known as the Ho Chi Minh trail in southeastern Laos during 1971. Due to his political connections with President Nguyễn Văn Thiệu, he was still serving as I Corps commander when the North Vietnamese launched the Easter Offensive in 1972. Lãm was recalled to Saigon on 2 May 1972 by Thiệu, who relieved him of his command, due to complaints regarding Lãm's fitness and competency as a general. He was succeeded as commander by Ngô Quang Trưởng former commander of the 1st Division and IV Corps.

The 20th Tank Regiment, the first tank regiment in the ARVN, was formed at Quảng Trị in 1971 equipped with the M48 Patton.

1975 Spring Offensive
Military Region 1's forces disintegrated during the 1975 Spring Offensive (the Hue–Da Nang Campaign). The situation for the South Vietnamese in Military Region 1 had regained some stability after the defeat of a three-division PAVN push during late 1974. By early the following year, Military Region 1 fielded three infantry divisions (the 1st, 2nd and 3rd), the elite Airborne and Marine Divisions, four Ranger Groups and the 1st Armored Brigade (established in 1969 to parent all the armored cavalry regiments in the MR). Until mid-March, the North Vietnamese had limited their offensive operations to attempts to cut Highway 1, the main north/south line of communication, between Huế and Da Nang and between Da Nang and Chu Lai. To confront the South Vietnamese, PAVN Brigadier General Lê Trọng Tấn had amassed a force of the crack 2nd, 304th, 324B, 325C and 711th Divisions and nine independent infantry regiments, three sapper regiments, three armored regiments, twelve anti-aircraft and eight artillery regiments.

At a meeting in Saigon on 13 March President Thiệu was briefed on the military situation by Trưởng and another corps commander. Thiệu then laid out his plan for national consolidation. As Trưởng understood it, he was free to redeploy his forces to hold the Da Nang area. Trưởng was shocked to discover, however, that the Airborne Division was to be removed to III Corps (unknown to Trưởng at the time, the Marine Division was also already earmarked for redeployment with both units then forming a new national reserve).
 
General Trưởng was recalled to Saigon on 19 March to brief Thiệu on his withdrawal plan. The general had developed two contingency plans: The first was predicated on government control of Highway 1, which would be utilized for two simultaneous withdrawals from Huế and Chu Lai to Da Nang; The second course presupposed PAVN interdiction of the highway and called for a withdrawal into three enclaves: Huế, Da Nang, and Chu Lai. This was to be only an interim measure, however, since the forces that withdrew to Huế and Chu Lai would then be sea-lifted to Da Nang by the navy. The president then stunned the general by announcing that he had misinterpreted his previous orders: The old imperial capital of Huế was not to be abandoned. Making matters worse, Trưởng discovered that his force was to be reduced by the removal of the Airborne Division.

Divisions

Notes

References 
Dougan, Clark, David Fulghum, et al. The Fall of the South. Boston: Boston Publishing Company, 1985.

Corps level formations of South Vietnam
Military units and formations established in the 1960s
Military units and formations disestablished in 1975